Architectural History is an annual peer-reviewed journal published by the Society of Architectural Historians of Great Britain (SAHGB).

The journal is published each autumn. The architecture of the British Isles is a major theme of the journal, but articles can consider all places and periods. All members of the SAHGB receive the journal, as do subscribing institutional libraries. Older issues from its inception in 1958 onwards are available online through JSTOR.

The editor-in-chief is Alistair Fair, of the University of Cambridge.

References

External links

Publications established in 1958
1958 establishments in the United Kingdom
Architectural history journals
Annual journals
English-language journals
Cambridge University Press academic journals